Julius Volker (June 18, 1903 – September 3, 1976) was an American politician who served in the New York State Assembly from Erie's 7th district from 1945 to 1965.

He died on September 3, 1976, in Buffalo, New York at age 73.

References

1903 births
1976 deaths
Republican Party members of the New York State Assembly
20th-century American politicians